Keith Bradley may refer to:

 Keith Bradley, Baron Bradley (born 1950), British Labour Party politician
 Keith Bradley (footballer) (born 1946), former English footballer